The Vole clock is a method of dating archaeological strata using vole teeth. Investigations at sites across Europe have allowed construction of a detailed framework of how different vole species evolved over the last million years, and where and when specific species became extinct.

For many sites it is considered the most accurate way of dating, and also provides information on the climate and local environment e.g. in the Pleistocene. Dr. Francis Wenban-Smith of Southampton University, a Stone Age specialist on assignment for Oxford Archaeology, described the Vole clock as "one of the wonders of modern science". However, an article published by Robert A. Martin concludes that "Sampling, chronological, and statistical issues seriously limit the accuracy and thus practical application of vole clocks generated from fossil arvicolid rodent samples"  Martin points out that size change (in teeth and animals) does not move in one direction and can reverse.

References

External links
 Use of Vole Clock on C4's Time Team

Incremental dating